Music Fan First is the sixth studio album from the soul singer Eric Roberson. It was released on August 25, 2009 on his longtime independent label Blue Erro Soul and on August 24, 2009 in the UK on Dome Records.

It features his biggest radio single to date, the duet with Lalah Hathaway "Dealing". The music video was directed by the team Christopher Adams & Hana "Blaq" McDowell, who also directed the video for the song "Still". Music Fan First would be his final album recorded and released independently, until he signed with Purpose Records/E1 Music to release his seventh album Mister Nice Guy.

Music Fan First also contains the song "Celebrate" which was dedicated to the passing of singer Michael Jackson. The album was released four days from what would have been his 51st birthday.

Track listing 
All songs written by Eric Roberson and Brett Baker, except as indicated.
 The Newness
 The Hunger (featuring W. Ellington Felton) (Eric Roberson, W. Ellington Felton, Brett Baker)
 A Tale Of Two (featuring Ben O'Neill and Michelle Thompson) (Eric Roberson, Brett Baker, Minnie Riperton, Richard Rudolph, Leon Ware)
 Borrow You
 Dealing (featuring Lalah Hathaway) (Eric Roberson, Lee Hutson, Jr.)
 Still
 How Could She Do It
 Further (featuring T3 of Slum Village) (Eric Roberson, R.L. Altman, Ralph Rice II, Craig Lane)
 The Power That Kisses Hold
 Howard Girls (featuring Geno Young, Brandon Hines and Aaron Abernathy) (Eric Roberson, Curt Chambers, Dana Sorey)
 Weekend Getaway (Eric Roberson, A. Jermaine Mobley)
 She (Eric Roberson, Osunlade)
 Wanna Believe It Again (featuring Wayna) (Eric Roberson, Dana Sorey)
 Bad for Me (Eric Roberson, Colin Emmanuel, Allan Simpson)
 Breakitdown (Eric Roberson, A. Jermaine Mobley)
 Pave a New Road (Eric Roberson, Curt Chambers, Brett Baker)
 Celebrate [Bonus] (featuring Sy Smith)

Personnel

 Drum programming: Brett Baker, Colin Emmanuel, A. Jermaine Mobley, Young RJ, Eric Roberson, Osunlade, JR Hutson
 Live Drums: Brett Baker
 Keyboards: Brett Baker, Colin Emmanuel, A. Jermaine Mobley, Young RJ, Dana Sorey, Osunlade, JR Hutson, Craig Lane
 Percussion: Donna Sorey
 Guitar: Ben O'Neil, Curt Chambers, Allan Simpson, A. Jermaine Mobley
 Bass: Wayne Moore, Jay Bratten
 Hammond organ: Dana Sorey
 Fender Rhodes: Curt Chambers, JR Hutson
 Trumpet: Matt Cappy
 Saxophone: Korey Riker
 Trombone: Aaron Goodie
 Executive producer: Eric Roberson, James Roberson, Charlotte Roberson
 Photography: D. Brown
 Art Direction and design: Concep

Samples
 "A Tale Of Two" contains a sample of "Inside My Love", as performed by Minnie Riperton.

References

2009 albums
Eric Roberson albums